Reno is an unincorporated community in Bond County, Illinois. Reno is located along a railroad line southeast of Sorento.

History 
Reno was formally established in 1883 upon the construction of a nearby Jacksonville and Southwestern Railroad line and was previously known as Cottonwood Grove and Augusta. A post office in the community existed as early as 1851.

Geography
Renos is located at an elevation of 577 feet. The community appears on the Sorento South United States Geological Survey map.

Nearby communities

 Ayers, Bond County, Illinois (3.4 miles ESE)
 Sorento, Illinois (3.6 miles WNW)
 Panama, Illinois (3.9 miles N)
 Donnellson, Illinois (4.3 miles NNE)
 Gilmore, Bond County, Illinois (5.6 miles W)
 Old Ripley, Illinois (6.3 miles SSW)
 Greenville, Illinois (7.9 miles SE)
 New Douglas, Illinois (8.2 miles W)

References

Unincorporated communities in Bond County, Illinois
Unincorporated communities in Illinois